Schelfstadt is a central quarter of the city of Schwerin, capital of the Mecklenburg-Vorpommern state of Germany.

Gallery

External links 

Schwerin